Cheng Bugao (1898–20 June 1966) was a prominent Chinese film director during the 1930s. Employed by the Mingxing Film Company, Cheng was responsible for several important "leftist" films in the period, including the Wild Torrents (1933) and Spring Silkworms (1933). Both films were based on screenplays by Xia Yan.

After the Second Sino-Japanese War, Cheng moved to Hong Kong, where he made films of a  purposefully apolitical nature.

Partial directorial filmography

See also
Mingxing Film Company

References

External links

Cheng Bugao at the Chinese Movie Database

Film directors from Zhejiang
Hong Kong film directors
1898 births
1966 deaths
Date of birth missing
Chinese film directors
Chinese silent film directors
Chinese emigrants to British Hong Kong